Steve or Steven Carter may refer to:

Steve Carter (Indiana politician) (born 1954), Attorney General of Indiana, U.S.
Steve Carter (footballer, born 1953), English footballer who played for Notts County, Derby County, Torquay United and Minnesota Kicks
Steve Carter (footballer, born 1972), English footballer who played for Scarborough
Steve Carter (playwright) (1929–2020), American playwright
Steve Carter (rugby league) (born 1970), Australian professional rugby league player
Steve Carter (baseball) (born 1964), American former Major League Baseball player
Steve Carter (Louisiana politician) (1943–2021), Louisiana State Representative
Steven Carter (novelist), American author of short stories and novels
Steven A. Carter (born 1958), American author of non-fiction and humor
Steven V. Carter (1915–1959), U.S. Representative from Iowa
Steve Carter (American football) (born 1962), American football player 
Steven R. Carter, American literary critic, and academic

See also
Carter (name)
Stephen Carter (disambiguation)